Anna M. Gade is a scholar of Islam, religion, Southeast Asia and environmental studies and is Vilas Distinguished Achievement Professor in the Gaylord Nelson Institute for Environmental Studies at the University of Wisconsin-Madison. She is also currently serving as an Associate Dean of the same Institute where she teaches courses in Environmental Humanities, Islamic Studies, and the academic study of religion and ethics in the Religious Studies Program.

Biography
Gade was born in Berkeley, California and graduated from Berkeley High School (California). She completed her B. A. in mathematics at Swarthmore College, in Swarthmore, Pennsylvania. She holds a master's from the University of Chicago and received her Ph.D. with distinction in the history of religions from the University of Chicago Divinity School, specializing in Islam. She has held teaching positions at different institutions in the United States and abroad including Cornell University (Near Eastern Studies), Princeton University (Music/Religion), Oberlin College (Religion), Victoria University of Wellington, New Zealand (Religious Studies), and in Languages and Cultures of Asia at University of Wisconsin-Madison. Since the 1900s, much of her research has been conducted in Indonesia.

Works
 Perfection Makes Practice: Learning, Emotion, and the Recited Qur’an in Indonesia (University of Hawai'i Press, 2004) 
 The Cham Rebellion: Survivors' Stories from the Villages, by Ysa Osman (Revising Editor, Documentation Center of Cambodia, 2006)
 The Qur’an: An Introduction (Oneworld Publications, 2010) 
 Muslim Environmentalisms: Religious and Social Foundations (Columbia University Press, 2019)

See also
 Richard Foltz

References 

Year of birth missing (living people)
Living people
American religion academics
American women non-fiction writers
People from Berkeley, California
Swarthmore College alumni
University of Chicago alumni
University of Chicago Divinity School alumni
Cornell University faculty
Princeton University faculty
Oberlin College faculty
University of Wisconsin–Madison faculty
American women academics
21st-century American women